Tirumalamba, a poet of the Vijayanagara Empire, wrote "Varadambika Parinayam", the story of marriage of King Achyuta Deva Raya, in Sanskrit.

Tirumalamba wrote that it was the task of Arya Mahile, the women concerned about Arya Dharma, to wake up the Mother (land). Tirumalamba wrote a number of poems invoking Kannadaness and the Kannada nation. C.N.Mangala, a noted Kannada critic observes that these were the poems to express Kannada nationalism for the very first time in Kannada.

Notes

Kannada poets
Indian women poets
People of the Vijayanagara Empire
Vijayanagara poets
Women of the Vjayanagara Empire